Dushasana, also spelled Duhshasana, Dussasana or Duhsasana, also known as Sushasana, is an antagonist in the Hindu epic Mahabharata. He was second eldest among the Kaurava princes and the younger brother of Duryodhana. Dushasan's jealousy and herd mentality were the two qualities said to have led to his downfall in the Mahabharata.

Etymology
His name derives from the Sanskrit words duḥ- "bad" and śāsana "administration"; thus duḥśāsana means "[one who is] bad in administration." His actual name Sushasana is derived from Sanskrit words su-"good" and śāsana "rule"; thus Suḥśāsana means "[one who is] good in administration." So, his actual name is antonym of his popularized name.

Birth and early life
When Dhritarashtra's queen Gandhari's pregnancy continued for an unusually long time, she beat her womb in frustration and out of jealousy towards Kunti, the wife of Pandu, who had just given birth to Yudhishthira (the eldest of the five Pandava brothers). At this, a hardened mass of grey-coloured flesh emerged from her womb. Gandhari was devastated and called upon Vyasa, the great sage who had prophesied she would give birth to one hundred sons, to redeem his words.

Vyasa divided the ball of flesh into one hundred equal pieces, each piece no bigger than a thumb. He put them in pots of milk, which were sealed and buried in the earth for two years. At the end of the second year, the first pot was opened and Duryodhana emerged. Within a period of one month all the other 99 sons of Dhritarashtra were born. Dushasana was the second after Duryodhana.

Dushasana was devoted to his older brother Duryodhana. He (along with Duryodhana and Shakuni) was very closely involved in the various schemes and plots to kill the Pandavas.

Draupadi's humiliation

After Yudhishthira lost a game of dice with Shakuni — losing first his kingdom, then his brothers and his wife Draupadi — Dushasana, at the behest of his brother Duryodhana, dragged Draupadi by the hair into the assembly and tried to disrobe her. Draupadi prayed to Krishna, who made her sari to be of an infinite length so that Dushasana could not take it off. The assembled men were amazed at this miracle. They condemned Dushasana and praised Draupadi. However, Draupadi was humiliated at being dragged into court by her hair, and swore that she would never again tie up her hair until it was washed in Dushasana's blood. Then Bhima, who could no longer watch Draupadi's insult in silence, arose. He vowed to tear open Dushasana's chest in battle and drink his blood. Bhima also exclaimed that if he could not fulfill his oath, then he would not meet his ancestors in heaven.

Kurukshetra war and Death
Dushasana played an important role in Kurukshetra War and fought many warriors.
On the first day of war, Dushasana was the first one to shot the first arrow. He fought a fierce battle with Nakula and later with Yudhishthira and was defeated by them.
On the second day of war, Dushasana killed Nakula’s bodyguards. An angry Nakula defeated and nearly killed Dushasana in a sword fight.
On the 10th day of war, Dushasana attacked and injured Shikhandi in order to save Bhishma.
On the 13th day of war, Dushasana was among the powerful warriors who brutally murdered Abhimanyu. Abhimanyu badly injured Dushasana. Later, his son Drumasena killed Abhimanyu.
On the 14th day, Dushasana tried to stop Arjuna from reaching to 
Jayadratha but defeated by him in a small archery duel.
During the night war, Dushasana defeated and killed Virata’s bodyguards.
On the 16th day of the Kurukshetra War, Dushasana killed Magadha’s minister Vrihanta. Bhima fought with Dushasana in a mace war and beat him. When Dushasana was unable to fight Bhima uprooted both the arms of Dushasana. Then he took out his armour, tore his chest using his bare hands and killed Dushasana. Dushasana’s death was the most brutal death in the entire epic. To fulfill his oath, Bhima drank the blood from Dushasana’s open chest. The soldiers who witnessed this brutal scene fainted, thinking of Bhima as a monster. All the Kaurava supporting warriors were highly disturbed by this scene. Bhima collected Dushasana’s blood and washed Draupadi’s open hair so that she could fulfill her oath of not tying her hair until they are not washed by Dushasana’s blood.

References

External links
 

 Characters in the Mahabharata